Merialus is a genus of extinct squirrel-like mammals belonging to the order Cimolesta.

Taxonomy
There are two species of Merialus recognized so far, M. martinae and M. bruneti. Both have been found in Ypresian-age deposits in the Paris Basin.

References

Cimolestans
Eocene mammals
Eocene mammals of Europe
Fossil taxa described in 1988
Prehistoric mammal genera